Grecian is an adjective referring to artefacts or culture of Ancient Greece. Wikipedia articles pertaining to this meaning include:
Grecian runes, an alphabet dating to Ancient Greece
Grecian philosophy, a system of thought and aesthetics
Grecian vase, pottery of ancient Greece
Ode on a Grecian Urn, a poem written by John Keats in 1819

Other uses:
Maritime
Grecian (1812), an American 5-gun schooner captured by the British in 1814 and renamed HMS Grecian
Grecian (1824 ship), a ship wrecked on the New South Wales coast in 1864
Grecian (barque), sailing ship wrecked in 1850 off Port Adelaide
HMS Grecian: any of four ships, see the disambiguation page HMS Grecian
HMS Grecian was the 5-gun American schooner Grecian (1812) captured in 1814 and armed with 10 guns
HMS Grecian, the 10-gun revenue cutter Dolphin, renamed in 1821 and sold in 1827
HMS Grecian, a 16-gun brig-sloop launched in 1838 and broken up in 1865
HMS Grecian, an Auk-class minesweeper transferred to Britain under Lend-lease
SS Grecian, one of the Allan Line Royal Mail Steamers, saved the Cromartyshire in 1898

Biology
Grecian anomalous blue, a butterfly found on the Balkan Peninsula
Grecian shoemaker, a butterfly of Central and South America
Grecian foxglove, a poisonous plant
Grecian juniper or Greek juniper, a large shrub
Grecian laurel, a large aromatic shrub
Grecian rose, Geum quellyon, a plant native to Chile

Others
Grecian bend, a stooped posture, also a dance, named after the gracefully inclined figures seen in the art of Ancient Greece
Grecian Coffee House, a London coffee house founded around 1665, a favoured meeting-place for members of the Royal Society
Grecian Formula, a men's hair coloring product
Grecian Guild Pictorial, an American physique magazine published from 1955 until 1968
Grecian Old Style, better known as Goudy Old Style, a typeface
Grecian Queen, an American champion Thoroughbred racehorse, foaled in 1950
Grecian Rocks (reef), a coral reef in the Key Largo area
Grecian Shelter, an architectural feature of Prospect Park in Brooklyn, New York
The Grecians, nickname of Exeter City F.C.